Diatraea lativittalis is a moth in the family Crambidae. It was described by Paul Dognin in 1910. It is found in Argentina.

References

Chiloini
Moths described in 1910